Pedro Alejandro Paterno y de Vera Ignacio (February 27, 1857 – April 26, 1911) was a Filipino politician infamous for being a turncoat. He was also a poet and a novelist.

His intervention on behalf of the Spanish led to the signing of the Pact of Biak-na-Bato on December 14, 1897, an account of which he published in 1910. Among his other works include the first novel written by a native Filipino, Ninay (1885), and the first Filipino collection of poems in Spanish, Sampaguitas y otras poesías varias ("Jasmines and Other Various Poems"), published in Madrid in 1880.

Early life
Paterno was born on February 17, 1857. He was a "child of privilege in a society of limited opportunities." He was one of 13 children born to Don Máximo Paterno and his second wife, Doña Carmen de Vera Ignacio. Máximo was exiled to Guam (then also part of the Spanish East Indies) for ten years following the 1872 Cavite mutiny and died on July 26, 1900, leaving behind considerable wealth.

Paterno finished Bachiller en Artes at Ateneo Municipal de Manila and gained fame with his conclusion. At the age of 14, he was sent to study in Spain, where he spent the next 11 years at the University of Salamanca and then the Central University of Madrid (now the Complutense University of Madrid). At Salamanca, he took courses in Philosophy and Theology, while at Madrid, he graduated with an expertise in law as a Doctor of Civil and Canon Law in 1880.

In 1876, he wrote his first opus entitled Influencia Social del Cristanismo wherein it shows how he consciously located himself in the metropolitan stream of Spanish Culture. It also unveiled the major themes of Paterno's works to come: law of social evolution, value of reason, human perfectability, and a synthesis of an essentialized "Orient" and "Occident" in Christianity.

In 1893, he was awarded the Order of Isabella the Catholic. In March 1894, he was appointed as the Director of Museo Biblioteca de Filipinas (now National Library of the Philippines); he was the first Filipino to hold that position.

Biak-na-Bato
At the trial of José Rizal in 1896, it was suggested that Paterno, along with Rizal, had incited the Katipunan because they had both written about pre-Spanish Philippine history. As evidence for their complicity, the Spanish prosecution cited Paterno's earlier work Antigua Civilización as promoting ideas which had "consequences both erroneous and injurious to Spanish sovereignty". Nobody moved against Paterno, however, because he was close to a significant number of Spanish officials – both military and civilian – who could vouch for him. Thus, Paterno, like many others of the Manila elite, distanced himself from the events of the Katipunan revolution.

In 1897, the Philippine revolutionary forces led by General Emilio Aguinaldo had been driven out of Cavite and retreated northwards from town to town until they finally settled in the village of Biak-na-Bato, in the town of San Miguel de Mayumo in Bulacan. Here, they established what became known as the Republic of Biak-na-Bato.

In late July 1897, Paterno presented himself to Governor-General Fernando Primo de Rivera, whom he had known while living in Spain, and offered his services as a mediator. Because many highly placed Spaniards of the time thought Paterno held great sway over the natives, Primo de Rivera accepted Paterno's offer. He called for a truce, explaining his decision to the Cortes Generales: "I can take Biak-na-Bato, any military man can take it, but I can not answer that I could crush the rebellion."

Paterno left Manila on August 4, 1897 and found Aguinaldo five days later. This began a three-month-long series of talks which saw Paterno constantly traveling between Manila, Biak-na-Bato, and some areas in Southern Luzon where a number of revolutionary chiefs held sway. During the negotiations, Paterno's wife Luisa died on November 27, 1897. In ceremonies from December 14 to 15 that year, Aguinaldo signed the Pact of Biak-na-Bato. He later proclaimed the official end of the Philippine Revolution on Christmas Day and left for Hong Kong via the port of Dagupan on December 27.

Paterno returned to Manila on January 11, 1898 amidst great celebration, but was spurned by Primo de Rivera and other authorities when he asked to be recompensed by being granted a dukedom, a seat in the Spanish Senate, and payment for his services in Mexican dollars.

Prime minister
Paterno was elected a delegate from Ilocos Norte and President of the Malolos Congress in September 1898. He served as prime minister of the First Philippine Republic in the middle of 1899, and served as head of the country's assembly, and the cabinet. Paterno was captured by the Americans in April 1900 in Antomoc, Benguet.

American colonial period

With the Philippine–American War after the signing of the Treaty of Paris in 1898, he was among the most prominent Filipinos who joined the American side and advocated the incorporation of the Philippines into the United States. As the editor and proprietor of the newspaper La Patria, he supported American dominion and gratitude towards Spain, from whence "the Filipinos derived their civilization." Paterno was elected to the Philippine Assembly in 1907, representing the province of La Laguna's 1st district in the 1st Philippine Legislature. He would serve until his term expired in 1909.

He died of cholera on April 26, 1911.

Legacy and notoriety

Despite Paterno's prominence in the many upheavals that defined the birth of the Philippine nation during his lifetime, Paterno's legacy is largely infamous among Philippine historians and nationalists.

Philippine historian Resil Mojares notes that:
History has not been kind to Pedro Paterno. A century ago, he was one of the country's premier intellectuals, blazing trails in Philippine letters. Today he is ignored in many of the fields in which he once held forth with much eminence, real and imagined. No full length biography or extended review of his corpus of writings has been written, and no one reads him today.

Mojares also indicated that his sarcastic and flamboyant attitude, wherein he seeks a high regard in the social hierarchy wherever he goes, invited the criticisms he received.

John Schumacher dismissed Paterno's works as "scholarly" in nature. He remarked that:
Paterno's "eccentric and ingenious lucubrations" on Philippine civilization undermined the national cause. "Reconstructing a Filipino past, however glorious in appearance, on false pretenses can do nothing to build a sense of national identity, much less offer guidance for the present or the future." 

Much of this is attributed to Paterno's penchant for turncoatism, as described by historian Ambeth Ocampo, who sums up his career thus:
Remember, Paterno was one of the greatest "balimbing" (turncoat) in history (perhaps he was the original "balimbing" in Philippine political history). He was first on the Spanish side, then when the declaration of independence was made in 1898, he "wormed his way to power" and became president of the Malolos Congress in 1899, then sensing the change in political winds after the establishment of the American colonial government, he became a member of the First Philippine Assembly.

List of works
Influencia Social del Cristianismo, 1876 pamphlet
Sampaguitas y otras poesías varias, 1880 anthology of poems
Ninay, 1885 novel
Magdapio, 1903 four-part opera
Aurora social, 1910–11 collection of novellas
Los ultimos romanticos: en la erupción del Volcán de Taal, 1911

Media portrayals
Portrayed by Yul Servo in the film, El Presidente (2012).
Portrayed by Leo Martinez in the film, Heneral Luna (2015), and its sequel, Goyo: Ang Batang Heneral (2018).
Portrayed by JV Ibesate in the hit musical of Tanghalang Pilipino, Mabining Mandirigma.

See also
Dolores Paterno

Notes

References

External links
Pedro Paterno's Proclamation of War on June 2, 1899
Ninay The first Filipino novel written by Pedro Paterno published by Filipiniana.net

1857 births
1911 deaths
Aguinaldo administration cabinet members
Ateneo de Manila University alumni
Burials at the Manila North Cemetery
Complutense University of Madrid alumni
Filipino people of Chinese descent
Filipino Resistance activists
Filipino writers
Members of the House of Representatives of the Philippines from Laguna (province)
Members of the Malolos Congress
Members of the Philippine Legislature
Nacionalista Party politicians
People from Santa Cruz, Manila
People of the Spanish–American War
People of the Philippine–American War
People of the Philippine Revolution
Prime Ministers of the Philippines
Spanish-language writers of the Philippines
University of Salamanca alumni